Don, don or DON and variants may refer to:

Places
County Donegal, Ireland, Chapman code DON
Don (river), a river in European Russia
Don River (disambiguation), several other rivers with the name
Don, Benin, a town in Benin
Don, Dang, a village and hill station in Dang district, Gujarat, India
Don, Nord, a commune of the Nord département in northern France
Don, Tasmania, a small village on the Don River, located just outside Devonport, Tasmania
Don, Trentino, a commune in Trentino, Italy
Don, West Virginia, a community in the United States
Don Republic, a temporary state in 1918–1920
Don Jail, a jail in Toronto, Canada

People

Role or title
Don (honorific), a Spanish, Portuguese, and Italian title, given as a mark of respect
Don, a crime boss, especially in the Mafia
Don, a resident assistant at universities in Canada and the U.S.
University don, in British and Irish universities, especially at Oxford, Cambridge, St Andrews and Dublin, a fellow or tutor of a college

People with the  name
Don (given name), a short form of the masculine given name Donald in Scots and English
George Don, Scottish botanist (1798–1856), abbreviated as G.Don

Fictional entities
Don (character), the main character of the Don franchise, a gangster
Don Wada, one of the main protagonists of the Taiko no Tatsujin series
Don Dogoier, Is A Main Character in Japanese Series Kaizoku Sentai Gokaiger

Films
Don (2006 Dutch film)
Don (2007 film), a Telugu film starring Akkineni Nagarjuna and Anushka
Don Number One, a Bengali 2012 film remake of the 2007 film
Don (franchise), an Indian gangster film franchise
Don (1978 film), a blockbuster Hindi film
Don (2006 Hindi film), a Bollywood remake of the 1978 film
Don 2, the sequel to the 2006 film
Don (2022 film), a Tamil film

Television
Don (TV series), a 2007 Indian reality TV series
"Don", an episode in Regular Show

Other uses in art and entertainment
"Don", a song by Miranda! from their 2004 album Sin Restricciones
"Don", a song by Trippie Redd, 2020
Battle Stadium D.O.N, a video game

Military and defense
Department of the Navy (or DON), a part of the United States Department of Defense
Don-2N radar, Russian anti-ballistic missile radar
Don-class submarine tender, Soviet-era class of submarine tenders
Orlets-1 (or DON), a reconnaissance satellite

Science

Chemistry
Dissolved Organic Nitrogen, or DON
2,5-Dimethoxy-4-nitroamphetamine, a recreational drug
6-Diazo-5-oxo-L-norleucine, an enzyme inhibitor
Deoxynivalenol, a mycotoxin

Biology
"-don" a suffix in the scientific names of many animals, meaning "tooth"
Dysbaric osteonecrosis, death of a portion of bone

Other uses
Dôn, a mother goddess in Welsh mythology
don (unit), a Korean unit of weight
Donburi, or don, a Japanese rice bowl dish
Russian Don, a horse breed
Tropical Storm Don (2011)
Director of nursing (long term care facility)
Director of nursing (other uses)

See also

Don Bridge (disambiguation)

Dom (disambiguation)
Dons (disambiguation)
Donald (disambiguation)